Sultan Mohammad Khan is a Pakistani politician who served as the Provincial Minister of Khyber Pakhtunkhwa for Law, Parliamentary Affairs and Human Rights, in office from 29 August 2018 to 9 Feb 2021. He was removed from his post because he was spotted in a video where he could be seen selling his Senate vote. He had been a Member of the Provincial Assembly of Khyber Pakhtunkhwa from August 2018 till January 2023. Previously, he was a member of the Provincial Assembly of Khyber Pakhtunkhwa  from May 2013 to May 2018.

Early life and education
Sultan Mohammad Khan was born on 4 July 1980, in Charsadda, Pakistan.

He has a degree in Bachelor of Laws, from the University of Peshawar. He also obtained a degree in Master of Laws  from the United Kingdom.

Political career
He ran for an election for seat of the Provincial Assembly of the North-West Frontier Province as an independent candidate from Constituency PF-18 (Charsadda-II) in 2008 Pakistani general election, but was unsuccessful. He received 2,891 votes and lost the seat to Barrister Arshad Abdullah, a candidate of Awami National Party (ANP).

He was elected to the Provincial Assembly of Khyber Pakhtunkhwa as a candidate of Qaumi Watan Party (QWP) from Constituency PK-18 (Charsadda-II) in 2013 Pakistani general election. He received 13,911 votes and defeated a candidate of ANP.

In 2017, he quit QWP and joined Pakistan Tehreek-e-Insaf (PTI).

He was re-elected to the Provincial Assembly of Khyber Pakhtunkhwa as a candidate of PTI from Constituency PK-58 (Charsadda-III) in 2018 Pakistani general election.

On 29 August 2018, he was inducted into the provincial Khyber Pakhtunkhwa cabinet of Chief Minister Mahmood Khan and was appointed as Provincial Minister of Khyber Pakhtunkhwa for Law, Parliamentary Affairs and Human Rights.

References

1980 births
Living people
Khyber Pakhtunkhwa MPAs 2013–2018
Pakistan Tehreek-e-Insaf MPAs (Khyber Pakhtunkhwa)
Khyber Pakhtunkhwa MPAs 2018–2023